"The Fugitive Kind" is the debut single by Australian rock band Mondo Rock, released in September 1978. It peaked at number 49 on the Kent Music Report. The song appears as a bonus track for Mondo Rock's debut studio album Primal Park.

Track listing 
 "The Fugitive Kind" (Ross Wilson, Tony Slavich) - 3:47
 "The Breaking Point" (Iain McLennan) - 4:57

Charts

References

Mondo Rock songs
Songs written by Ross Wilson (musician)
1978 songs
1978 debut singles
Song recordings produced by Ross Wilson (musician)